Meredith Goodwin "Moe" Morhardt (born January 16, 1937) is an American former Major League Baseball first baseman. He played parts of the 1961 and 1962 seasons with the Chicago Cubs, appearing in 25 major league games.

Playing career
Morhardt attended the University of Connecticut, where he was a two-sport All-American in soccer and baseball, also playing basketball during his freshman year.

After three seasons of baseball at Connecticut, Morhardt was signed by the Chicago Cubs as an amateur free agent in summer 1959. He spent the remainder of 1959 at three minor league levels, spending most of the season with the Class D Paris Lakers. He spent all of 1960 with the Class A Lancaster Red Roses. He was assigned to the minor leagues again in 1961 and played much of the season with the Class B Wenatchee Chiefs. In September, he was called up to the Cubs and made his major league debut on September 7, 1961.  He appeared in seven games for the Cubs that month, starting each at first base and hitting .278.

Morhardt began the 1962 season with Chicago, appearing in 18 games as a pinch-hitter. After hitting .125 with the Cubs, Morhardt was sent down to the minor leagues and split the rest of the season between Class B Wenatchee and Class AA San Antonio.

He spent 1963 and 1964 in the minor leagues before retiring from professional baseball following the 1964 season.

Coaching career
After his playing career, Morhardt was the head baseball coach at The Gilbert School in Winsted, Connecticut from 1967–1987, also serving, at times, as the school's boys' soccer coach, boys' basketball coach, and athletic director.  As head baseball coach, Morhardt had a record of 299-134, winning eight league titles and four Class M state championships.  Starting prior to the 1988 season, Morhardt coached for seven seasons for the Hartford Hawks college baseball team, serving as an assistant from 1988–1992 and head coach from 1993–1994.  From 1997–1999, he was the head coach of the Western Connecticut Colonials baseball team.  Morhardt also spent time as the head coach of the Danbury Westerners of the New England Collegiate Baseball League, coaching the team from 1998–2004.

Morhardt was elected to the Manchester Sports Hall of Fame on May 20, 1980.

Personal life
Morhardt had three sons, Darryl, Greg and Kyle. Darryl played baseball professional in the Atlanta Braves farm system before transitioning to coaching. Greg played professionally in the Minnesota Twins and Detroit Tigers systems before transitioning to coaching. As a scout for the Los Angeles Angels, Greg Morhardt was credited with discovering Mike Trout as a high school baseball player.

Yearly coaching records

NCAA

Collegiate summer baseball

NECBL

References

External links

1937 births
Living people
All-American college baseball players
Baseball players from Connecticut
Chicago Cubs players
UConn Huskies baseball players
UConn Huskies men's basketball players
UConn Huskies men's soccer players
Fort Worth Cats players
Hartford Hawks baseball coaches
Lancaster Red Roses players
Major League Baseball first basemen
Paris Lakers players
Sportspeople from Manchester, Connecticut
Salt Lake City Bees players
San Antonio Missions players
Western Connecticut State Colonials baseball coaches
Wenatchee Chiefs players
Association footballers not categorized by position
American men's basketball players
Association football players not categorized by nationality